Jake Michael Harvie (born 5 March 1998) is an Australian field hockey player who plays as a defender for the Australian national team. He also is a Commonwealth Games gold medallist.

Harvie was born in Dardanup, Western Australia, and made his senior international debut at the 2017 International Festival of Hockey in Bendigo, Australia.

Harvie won his first major tournament with Australia at the 2016-17 Hockey World League Final in Bhubaneswar, India. The team defeated Argentina 2–1 in the final to win the tournament.

In March 2018, Harvie was selected in the Australian national squad for the 2018 Commonwealth Games. The team won the gold medal, defeating New Zealand 2–0 in the final.

He is the grandson of former Australian three-time hockey Olympian Gordon Pearce.

References

External links
 
 
 
 

1998 births
Living people
Australian male field hockey players
Male field hockey defenders
Field hockey players at the 2018 Commonwealth Games
Field hockey players at the 2022 Commonwealth Games
Australian people of Anglo-Indian descent
Australian sportspeople of Indian descent
2018 Men's Hockey World Cup players
Commonwealth Games medallists in field hockey
Commonwealth Games gold medallists for Australia
20th-century Australian people
21st-century Australian people
Sportsmen from Western Australia
2023 Men's FIH Hockey World Cup players
Medallists at the 2018 Commonwealth Games
Medallists at the 2022 Commonwealth Games